The Division of Cooper is an Australian Electoral Division in the state of Victoria. It takes in the northern suburbs of Melbourne. The division was contested for the first time at the 2019 federal election, with Ged Kearney of the Australian Labor Party (ALP) elected as its inaugural member of parliament. She had previously represented the Division of Batman since the 2018 by-election.

Geography
Federal electoral division boundaries in Australia are determined at redistributions by a redistribution committee appointed by the Australian Electoral Commission. Redistributions occur for the boundaries of divisions in a particular state, and they occur every seven years, or sooner if a state's representation entitlement changes or when divisions of a state are malapportioned.

History

The division is named in honour of the Aboriginal Australian political activist William Cooper (1861–1941).

The Division of Cooper was created in 2018 after the Australian Electoral Commission oversaw a mandatory redistribution of divisions in Victoria. Cooper's geography mirrors almost entirely the Division of Batman, which it replaced in the redistribution. Unlike Batman, Cooper includes parts of Coburg North which had previously belonged in the neighbouring division of Wills, though it no longer features parts of Thomastown or Bundoora.

The seat was notionally held by the Labor Party on a 0.6% margin over the Greens, when compared to the result for Batman at the 2016 federal election. At the 2019 election incumbent Ged Kearney received a swing of over 13% making the seat once again safe for the ALP.

Members

Election results

References

External links
 Division of Cooper – Australian Electoral Commission

Electoral divisions of Australia
Constituencies established in 2019
2019 establishments in Australia
City of Darebin
City of Yarra
Electoral districts and divisions of Greater Melbourne